Eremogone macradenia is a species of flowering plant in the family Caryophyllaceae known by the common names Mojave sandwort and desert sandwort.

Distribution
It is native to the Southwestern United States, where it grows on desert slopes and in dry woodland and sagebrush, such as in the Mojave Desert in California.

Description
This is a perennial herb producing a tuft of erect stems 20 to 40 centimeters tall. The leaves are needlelike, a few centimeters long and sharp or blunt at the tip. The inflorescence is an open cyme of white flowers each with five petals. The fruit is a toothed capsule containing several small reddish to black seeds.

Varieties
There are four varieties of this species. Three are not rare but one variety, var. kuschei, is limited to about 130 individuals in the San Gabriel Mountains of eastern Los Angeles County, California.

References

External links
Jepson Manual Treatment - Arenaria macradenia — TJM2: Eremogone macradenia.
USDA Plants Profile: Arenaria macradenia

Caryophyllaceae
Flora of Arizona
Flora of California
Flora of Nevada
Flora of Utah
North American desert flora
Flora of the California desert regions
Natural history of the Mojave Desert
Flora of the Sierra Nevada (United States)
~
~
Natural history of the Central Valley (California)
Flora without expected TNC conservation status